Heinrich "Henry" Dockweiler (1824 – April 12, 1887) was a patriarch of pioneering family in American Los Angeles, California as it was growing from the Mexican Pueblo de Los Ángeles era of Alta California.

Biography
Dockweiler was born in Contwig near Zweibrücken, in the Rheinkreis of Bavaria (now in Rhineland-Palatinate). He emigrated to the United States, landing in Brooklyn. He was known commonly after emigration as Henry Dockweiler.

California
He arrived in Los Angeles in 1852.

Dockweiler married Margaretha Sugg in La Iglesia de Nuestra Señora la Reina de los Ángeles on the Los Angeles Plaza, on 13 October 1861. He and his wife had 4 sons: John Henry Dockweiler, Joseph Andrew Dockweiler, John Dockweiler (died in infancy), and Isidore Bernard Dockweiler (the youngest, and who would become a major legal and political figure in California history).

He was opposed to slavery and secession, was one of the first 25 people in Los Angeles to support Abraham Lincoln.  He was elected to serve as a member of the Los Angeles Common Council from 1870–1874.

Henry Dockweiler died in 1887. He was interred in the old Calvary Cemetery of Los Angeles, and later reinterred in the new Calvary Cemetery (New Calvary Catholic Cemetery) in East Los Angeles.

See also
 Dockweiler State Beach

References

Politicians from Los Angeles
Los Angeles Common Council (1850–1889) members
19th-century American politicians
1824 births
1887 deaths
Bavarian emigrants to the United States
People from Südwestpfalz
Burials at Calvary Cemetery (Los Angeles)
Date of birth missing